Natvarlal Bhagwandas Parmar  was an Indian politician. He was elected to the Lok Sabha lower house of the Parliament of India from  Dhandhuka, Gujarat  as a member of the Janata Party.

References

External links
Official Biographical Sketch in Lok Sabha Website

Lok Sabha members from Gujarat
India MPs 1977–1979
1927 births
2010 deaths